Leo "The Whistler" Shepherd was a jazz trumpet player in the big band era.  He came to prominence playing in Lionel Hampton's big band in 1946.

In his career Leo Shepherd pushed the commonly accepted range of the trumpet to new heights.  He is noted for his ability to play in the extreme upper range of the trumpet (triple C's and above) with amazing power.  He was an early influence on many high note trumpeters, including Canadian trumpeter Maynard Ferguson, who has mentioned Shepherd in interviews.

Shepherd made approximately 40 recordings between the years of 1946 and 1951.  He recorded with such musicians as Lionel Hampton, Quincy Jones, Wes Montgomery, Jimmy Scott, Fats Navarro, Bing Crosby, and Charles Mingus.

External links
ScreamTrumpet.com

American jazz trumpeters
American male trumpeters
Possibly living people
Year of birth missing
American male jazz musicians